The beoseon is a type of paired socks worn with hanbok, Korean traditional clothing and is made for protection, warmth, and style. It is also called  (족의), jokgeon (족건) or mal (말) in hanja. According to a book titled  (훈몽자회,訓蒙字會) written by Choe Sejin (최세진,崔世珍) in 1527 during the reign of King Jungjong of the Joseon Dynasty (1392 - 1910),  was called  (보션말), so it may be called by the name before the time.

It is not clear when  first began to be worn, but ancient  is assumed to be a form extended from a trouser or bojagi (wrapping clothes) for protecting the foot. During the period of the Three Kingdoms of Korea (57 BC – 668 AD),  made of silk was worn but it was limited by social class. In the Joseon period, beoseon made of a white fabric was usually worn regardless of class except special occasions.

Types

The types of beoseon can be varied by purpose, shape, and sewing technique. Goteun beoseon (곧은버선) or also called godeulmok beoseon (고들목버선) and nuin beoseon (누인버선) are defined by shape.

According to sewing technique, beoseon is divided into som beoseon, gyeop beoseon, hot beoseon, nubi beoseon, and tarae beoseon. Som beoseon (솜버선) is composed of the outer fabric and cotton (som in Korean) as a batting to give foot warmth and style. Gyeop beoseon (겹버선) is made with two layers (gyeop) of a fabric without stuffing the inside. Hot beoseon (홑버선) is made with one layer (hot) and worn as an inner sock to prevent the outer beoseon from getting dirty. Nubi beoseon (누비버선) is made by quilting (nubi) and usually worn for protection against the cold during winter. The beoseon is considered practical because of the easiness to handle after cleaning although the running stitches can be broken or it is stiff than other beoseon. Tarae beoseon (타래버선) is decorative socks for children. After quilted, tarae beosoen is embroidered with strings in various colors, and a string is attached to each portion of ankle to bind them at the front.

Although the shape of beoseon does not reflect gender, beoseon for men have a straighter seam than that of women.

See also
Hanbok
Sock
Hosiery
Dress socks
Anklet (sock)

References

Socks
Korean footwear
Clothing